The Philosophy of Time Society is an organization which grew out of a National Endowment for the Humanities Summer Seminar on the Philosophy of Time offered by George N. Schlesinger in 1991.  The organization itself was formed in 1993.  Its stated goal is "to promote the study of the philosophy of time from a broad analytic perspective, and to provide a forum as an affiliated group with the American Philosophical Association, to discuss the issues in and related to the philosophy of time."

The Philosophy of Time Society's meetings are held at the meetings of the American Philosophical Association.  In the past, they have included many notable scholars such as Hud Hudson, Robin Le Poidevin, Ned Markosian, Hugh Mellor, John Perry, Theodore Sider, Michael Tooley, Dean Zimmerman.  Topics of papers have varied widely.

References

External links 
 George Schlesinger Memorial Site
 Philosophy of Time Society page at The University of Nottingham
 Philosophy of Time Society Forum

Philosophical societies in the United States
Philosophy of time